{{Chembox
| Verifiedfields = changed
| Watchedfields = changed
| verifiedrevid = 412683567
| ImageFile = HBT.png
| ImageFile_Ref = 
| ImageSize = 121
| ImageName = Skeletal formula of a minor tautomer of HBT
| Name = HBT
| IUPACName = ''N,N-Bis-(1H-tetrazol-5-yl)-hydrazine
| OtherNames = 1,2-Ditetrazolylhydrazine
5,5'-Hydrazinebistetrazole
BTH
|Section1=
|Section2=
}}HBT''' is a bistetrazole.  It is an explosive approximately as powerful as HMX or CL-20, but it releases less toxic reaction products when detonated: ammonia and hydrogen cyanide.  When combined with ADN or AN oxidizers, the amount of HCN produced by a deflagration may be reduced.  The compound is thus considered by its advocates to be a more environmentally friendly explosive than traditional nitroamine-based explosives.

References

See also
 1,1'-Azobis-1,2,3-triazole
 G2ZT

Explosive chemicals
Hydrazines
Tetrazoles